Svojetín is a municipality and village in Rakovník District in the Central Bohemian Region of the Czech Republic. It has about 400 inhabitants.

Administrative parts
The village of Veclov is an administrative part of Svojetín.

References

Villages in Rakovník District